Pici is thick, hand-rolled pasta, like fat spaghetti. It originates in the province of Siena in Tuscany; in the Montalcino area they are also referred to as pinci.

The dough is typically made from flour and water only. The addition of egg is optional, being determined by family traditions. Alternatively, finely chopped or shredded spinach can be used in place of water.

The dough is rolled out in a thick flat sheet, then cut into strips. In some families, the strip of dough is rolled between one palm and the table, while the other hand is wrapped with the rest of the strip. It can also be formed by rolling the strip between the palms. Either method forms a thick pasta, slightly thinner than a common pencil. Unlike spaghetti or macaroni, this pasta is not uniform in size and has variations of thickness along its length.

It is eaten with a variety of foods, particularly:

See also
 List of pasta
 Bigoli
 Cumian
 Udon

References

Types of pasta
Cuisine of Tuscany